Wabush is a small town in the western tip of Labrador, bordering Quebec, known for transportation and iron ore operations.

Economy
Wabush is the twin community of Labrador City. At its peak population in the late 1970s, the region had a population of just over 22,000. A reduction in iron mining operations in the late 20th century caused a major decline in jobs and population. When cliffs natural resources Canada, had to close and cold store the scully mine property (Wabush mines) since 2018 tacora resources inc began and has since successfully restarted the scully property slowly reinvigorating the community and investing back into the property and community.

As of 2011, Wabush's population was 1,861. Most residents work in the nearby mines of the  Iron Ore Company of Canada, now a unit of Rio Tinto Mines and the scully mine of tacora resources inc

Companies in and around Wabush include:

 Tacora Resources (owner of former Wabush Mines site)

While remote, the town contains modern amenities. A shopping centre includes a post office, bank, a restaurant, a bar, and a snowmobile store. There is also a recreational centre (now closed) which included a bowling alley, gymnasium, swimming pool, a teen centre, and a weight lifting room. an ice arena, a library, a legion building that serves alcoholic beverages, a furniture store, several playgrounds, a school, a church, two corner stores, and a hotel (which also includes a restaurant, a barber shop, and a bar).

Transportation
Air transportation needs for the twin communities are served by Wabush Airport and seasonally by Wabush Water Aerodrome. It used to receive more frequent service by Air Gaspé, which was acquired by Quebecair in 1973. The latter ended as an independent business in 1986, acquired in turn by CP Air in 1986 and Canadian Airlines in 1987. Currently the area is serviced by Exploits Valley Air Services), Provincial Airlines, Pascan Air and Air Inuit, this airport is no longer covered by ARFF (airport rescue and firefighting) services and the community of Labrador city has withdrawn firefighting services over safety concerns with transport Canada.

Climate
Like most of Labrador, Wabush has a subarctic climate (Köppen Dfc) with more precipitation than is typical for this type of climate due to the persistent Icelandic Low, which give the region some of the rainiest and snowiest weather in all of Canada. Especially in summer, cloudiness is common due to the lakes nearby and the unstable northerly airstreams that prevail, but because the town is relatively far from the open sea, there is more sunshine in Wabush than in St. John's due to the absence of fog from the Labrador Current. Snow usually melts away in May.

Demographics 

Notable residents
Mike Adam, Canadian curler
Shawn Doyle, actor
Michael Crummey, poet and writer

Literary references
Wabush appears in the John Wyndham post-catastrophe novel The Chrysalids under the name of Waknuk.

References

External links
Labrador West
Wabush - Encyclopedia of Newfoundland and Labrador, vol.5, p. 494-495.

Labrador West
Populated places in Labrador
Mining communities in Newfoundland and Labrador
Towns in Newfoundland and Labrador